

Events

Publications

Births 
 January 28 - Roberto Ardigò (died 1920)
 May 26 - Boris Chicherin (died 1904)
 July 12 - Nikolay Chernyshevsky (died 1889)
 September 28 - Friedrich Albert Lange (died 1875)
 October 16 - Nikolay Strakhov (died 1896)
 October 28 - Joseph Dietzgen (died 1888)

Deaths

References

Philosophy
19th-century philosophy
Philosophy by year